Diamond Safari is a 1958 American crime film directed by Gerald Mayer and starring Kevin McCarthy, Betty McDowall and André Morell. Its plot involves an American who battles diamond smugglers in Africa.

Filmed in South Africa in 1955, the film features the first (and only) two 30-minute episodes of a television series called African Drumbeat.

Cast
 Kevin McCarthy – Harry Jordan
 Robert Bice – Reubens
 Tommy Buson – Medicine Man
 John Clifford – Doc
 Joanna Douglas – Petey
 Frances Driver – Glass Blower's Wife
 Joel Herholdt – Sergeant van der Cliffe
 Hanna Landy – Wanda
 Betty McDowall – Louise Saunders
 Michael McNeile – Phillips
 Harry Mekela – Police Boy
 André Morell – Williamson
 Patrick Simpson – Carlton
 Geoffrey Tsobe – Stephen Timbu
 Gert Van den Bergh – Compound Manager

Production
African Drumbeat is a TV series produced by Gerard Mayer for Edward Dukoff, personal manager of Danny Kaye. It was done in partnership with the Schlesinger Organization of South Africa and Great Britain.

Larry Marcus wrote three scripts for the series which focused on Harry Jordan, an American soldier of fortune in South Africa. Kevin McCarthy was cast in this role. Filming began in South Africa on 1 July 1955.

There was location filming in Krueger National Park. Filming was completed by October 1955.

No TV series resulted. The episodes were cut together and released as a feature film.

References

External links

1958 films
1958 crime films
Films set in South Africa
Films shot in South Africa
Television pilots not picked up as a series
20th Century Fox films
Television films as pilots
1950s English-language films
American crime films
1950s American films